Durgada is a rural village in Deoli tahsil, Wardha district, Maharashtra, India.

Demographics 
As of the census of 2011, there were 609 people residing in the village. The population density was 190 people per square kilometer (480/sq mi). There were 181 households within the village. Males constitute 50.5% of the population and females 49.5%. Durgada has an average literacy rate of 74.4%, slightly higher than the national average of 74%. Male literacy is at 40.1%, while female literacy is 34.3%. In Durgada, 9.3% of the population is age 6 or under.

References 

Villages in Wardha district